The women's 200 metre butterfly event at the 2010 Asian Games took place on 15 November 2010 at Guangzhou Aoti Aquatics Centre.

There were 13 competitors from 9 countries who took part in this event. Two heats were held, the heat in which a swimmer competed did not formally matter for advancement, as the swimmers with the top eight times from the both field qualified for the finals.

Jiao Liuyang from China won the gold medal, Natsumi Hoshi from Japan won the silver medal, South Korean swimmer Choi Hye-ra finished with third place.

Schedule
All times are China Standard Time (UTC+08:00)

Records

Results

Heats

Final

References

 16th Asian Games Results

External links 
 Women's 200m Butterfly Heats Official Website
 Women's 200m Butterfly Ev.No.17 Final Official Website

Swimming at the 2010 Asian Games